Francis Anthony Brickowski (born August 14, 1959) is an American former professional basketball player, formerly in the National Basketball Association (NBA).

College and overseas career
Born in Bayville, New York, Brickowski played college basketball for four years as a power forward/center for Penn State. He won the John Lawther Award in 1980 as Penn State's MVP.

Brickowski was then selected with the 11th pick of the third round of the 1981 NBA draft by the New York Knicks. The Knicks considered him not quite ready for the NBA, so he began his professional basketball career in Italy. After a year in Italy, he played for another year in France, and the Knicks relinquished their draft rights after the 1982–83 NBA season. Brickowski then played another season overseas for Maccabi Tel Aviv in Israel.

NBA career

Seattle SuperSonics
Brickowski signed with the Seattle SuperSonics for the 1984–85 season on September 23, 1984, arriving in the league three years after being drafted. He played in Seattle two seasons.

Los Angeles Lakers
He signed on with the Los Angeles Lakers on October 8, 1986 but only played part of one season.

San Antonio Spurs
The Lakers traded him to the San Antonio Spurs, along with Pétur Guðmundsson, two draft choices and cash, for Mychal Thompson. Although Brickowski only played 7 games the rest of that season, he played 3 more productive seasons for San Antonio, including scoring a career-high 16 points per game during the 1987–88 season.

Milwaukee Bucks
During the 1990 off-season, the salary cap went up, which led to Brickowski being traded to the Milwaukee Bucks for Paul Pressey, to which the Bucks agreed due to an injury to Larry Krystkowiak. On March, 22, 1991, Brickowski scored 32 points and grabbed 8 rebounds in a 99–92 victory in Los Angeles against the Lakers. Although the Bucks finished with a respectable 48–34 record, they would be surprisingly swept by Charles Barkley and the Philadelphia 76ers in the first round of the playoffs. The Bucks would not return to the playoffs until the 1998–99 season. He was a productive player during his time in Milwaukee. During 1991–92, Brickowski was found with an ounce of cannabis at his Montana ranch. He pleaded guilty, and was forced to pay a $2,000 fine and undergo drug counseling.

Charlotte Hornets
At the 1994 trading deadline, The Bucks traded Brickowski to the Charlotte Hornets with a first-round draft pick for Mike Gminski. He spent the rest of the season with Charlotte.

Sacramento Kings
The next season Brickowski joined the Sacramento Kings. However, he injured his shoulder during preseason, aggravating the injury in a practice in January, and ended up being lost for the entire season.

Return to Seattle
Brickowski signed on for a second stint with Seattle, in which he became a surprising contributor in terms of three-pointers, hitting 32 of 79 (.405). He helped Seattle make it to the 1996 NBA Finals against Chicago Bulls. During that series, Brickowski became notorious in his very physical defense against Dennis Rodman that led to several technical and flagrant fouls.

Boston Celtics
Brickowski signed as a free agent with the Boston Celtics on August 1, 1996. After only 17 games, he was released on July 7, 1997, and retired, holding career averages of 10 points, 5 rebounds and two assists per game, in 731 contests.

After the NBA
One year after he retired in 1997, Brickowski joined a team of retired NBA players on a tour of China for a series of exhibition games against the Chinese national team.

Brickowski currently works with the NBA Players Association and lives in Montana. He is married to Meaghan McCarthy.

In a 2020 interview, Brickowski recounted one of the "wildest" moments of his life: "Charles Oakley comes up behind me and grabs me and we laugh. He gets a phone call and he says, ‘I’m talking with Brick,’ and then he says to me, ‘Let’s go.’ So I just follow him out the door, we go to this other tower and we up and we go to Michael Jordan’s suite and he has a gambling game still going on from the night before. It’s nine o’clock in the morning and I look around the room and all I see is piles of cash. My mind goes to, ‘We’ll put sleeping gas under the door, everyone will get knocked out and we’ll split the profits.’ I saw Oakley later that night and said, ‘Oak, how much money was in that room? There must have been a million dollars in that room.’ He held up two fingers – there was $2 million in cash in that room."

NBA career statistics

Regular season 

|-
| style="text-align:left;"| 
| style="text-align:left;"|Seattle
| 78 || 9 || 14.3 || .492 || .000 || .669 || 3.3 || 1.3 || 0.4 || 0.2 || 4.9
|-
| style="text-align:left;"| 
| style="text-align:left;"|Seattle
| 40 || 2 || 7.8 || .517 || – || .667 || 1.4 || 0.5 || 0.3 || 0.2 || 2.0
|-
| style="text-align:left;"| 
| style="text-align:left;"|L.A. Lakers
| 37 || 0 || 10.9 || .564 || – || .678 || 2.6 || 0.3 || 0.4 || 0.1 || 3.9
|-
| style="text-align:left;"| 
| style="text-align:left;"|San Antonio
| 7 || 0 || 11.9 || .333 || .000 || .909 || 2.7 || 0.7 || 0.9 || 0.3 || 4.3
|-
| style="text-align:left;"| 
| style="text-align:left;"|San Antonio
| 70 || 68 || 31.8 || .528 || .200 || .768 || 6.9 || 3.8 || 1.1 || 0.5 || 16.0
|-
| style="text-align:left;"| 
| style="text-align:left;"|San Antonio
| 64 || 60 || 28.5 || .515 || .000 || .715 || 6.3 || 2.0 || 1.6 || 0.5 || 13.7
|-
| style="text-align:left;"| 
| style="text-align:left;"|San Antonio
| 78 || 12 || 18.4 || .545 || .000 || .674 || 4.2 || 1.3 || 0.8 || 0.5 || 6.6
|-
| style="text-align:left;"| 
| style="text-align:left;"|Milwaukee
| 75 || 73 || 25.5 || .527 || .000 || .798 || 5.7 || 1.7 || 1.1 || 0.6 || 12.6
|-
| style="text-align:left;"| 
| style="text-align:left;"|Milwaukee
| 65 || 60 || 23.9 || .524 || .500 || .767 || 5.3 || 1.9 || 0.9 || 0.4 || 11.4
|-
| style="text-align:left;"| 
| style="text-align:left;"|Milwaukee
| 66 || 64 || 31.4 || .545 || .308 || .728 || 6.1 || 3.0 || 1.2 || 0.7 || 16.9
|-
| style="text-align:left;"| 
| style="text-align:left;"|Milwaukee
| 43 || 40 || 33.5 || .482 || .167 || .775 || 6.5 || 3.8 || 1.2 || 0.4 || 15.2
|-
| style="text-align:left;"| 
| style="text-align:left;"|Charlotte
| 28 || 6 || 23.3 || .502 || .500 || .746 || 4.5 || 2.0 || 1.0 || 0.4 || 10.1
|-
| style="text-align:left;"| 
| style="text-align:left;"|Seattle
| 63 || 8 || 15.7 || .488 || .405 || .709 || 2.4 || 0.9 || 0.4 || 0.1 || 5.4
|-
| style="text-align:left;"| 
| style="text-align:left;"|Boston
| 17 || 2 || 15.0 || .438 || .350 || .714 || 2.0 || 0.9 || 0.3 || 0.2 || 4.8
|- class="sortbottom"
| style="text-align:center;" colspan="2"| Career
| 731 || 404 || 22.3 || .519 || .324 || .740 || 4.7 || 1.9 || 0.9 || 0.4 || 10.0

Playoffs 

|-
|style="text-align:left;"|1988
|style="text-align:left;"|San Antonio
|3||3||37.7||.500||1.000||.684||7.3||4.7||2.0||0.7||19.3
|-
|style="text-align:left;"|1990
|style="text-align:left;"|San Antonio
|10||0||16.1||.574||–||.654||4.4||1.1||0.8||0.1||7.9
|-
|style="text-align:left;"|1991
|style="text-align:left;"|Milwaukee
|3||3||36.7||.533||.000||.500||8.7||1.0||0.3||0.7||18.3
|-
|style="text-align:left;"|1996
|style="text-align:left;"|Seattle
|21||3||9.8||.421||.273||.750||1.4||0.5||0.3||0.2||2.0
|- class="sortbottom"
| style="text-align:center;" colspan="2"| Career
| 37 || 9 || 15.9 || .514 || .280 || .635 || 3.3 || 1.1 || 0.6 || 0.3 || 6.3

Recognition
Brickowski's surname is believed to be the inspiration for the character Emmet Brickowski (voiced by Chris Pratt) from The Lego Movie.

References

External links
Databasebasketball stats
Basketpedya career data

1959 births
Living people
American expatriate basketball people in France
American expatriate basketball people in Israel
American expatriate basketball people in Italy
American men's basketball players
Basketball players from New York (state)
Boston Celtics players
Charlotte Hornets players
Israeli Basketball Premier League players
Los Angeles Lakers players
Maccabi Tel Aviv B.C. players
Milwaukee Bucks players
New York Knicks draft picks
Penn State Nittany Lions basketball players
People from Bayville, New York
People from Locust Valley, New York
Power forwards (basketball)
San Antonio Spurs players
Seattle SuperSonics players
Sportspeople from Lake Oswego, Oregon